Mohit Mayur Jakaprakash (born 14 September 1993) is an Indian tennis player.

Jayaprakash has a career high ATP singles ranking of 577 achieved on 1 February 2016. He also has a career high ATP doubles ranking of 460 achieved on 23 May 2016.

Jayaprakash made his ATP main draw debut at the 2012 Aircel Chennai Open in the doubles draw partnering Ramkumar Ramanathan.

References

External links

1993 births
Living people
Indian male tennis players
Racket sportspeople from Mumbai
Racket sportspeople from Chennai